Platycypha amboniensis is a species of damselfly in the family Chlorocyphidae. It is endemic to Kenya.  Its natural habitats are subtropical or tropical moist montane forests and rivers. It is threatened by habitat loss.

Sources 

Endemic fauna of Kenya
Insects of Kenya
Odonata of Africa
Insects described in 1915
Chlorocyphidae
Taxonomy articles created by Polbot